Sultan Bello Mosque also known as The Kaduna Central Mosque, is one of the largest mosques in Kaduna State, Nigeria, built in 1962. It is named after the then Sultan of Sokoto, Muhammadu Bello the son of Usman dan Fodio. The present Chief Imam of the mosque is Suleiman Muhammad Adam, a former lecturer in the department of Arabic and Islamic studies Kaduna State University.

History 

The mosque was named after Muhammad Bello.

Gallery

Sultan Bello mosque was expanded from its original existing prayer area of 220m2 into a larger prayer area of 2,300m2.

See also
Islam in Nigeria
List of mosques

References

Mosques in Nigeria
Religious buildings and structures converted into mosques